The videography of South Korean K-Pop band Secret consists of twelve music videos, 1 concert tour video, 2 music video compilations, 1 music video single and three promotional videos. In 2009, Secret signed a recording contract with TS Entertainment and released their first single "I Want You Back" which became their first music video. Secret's first music video to receive attention in South Korea was "Magic" and became one of their popular songs because of its choreography.  The same year, the group released "Madonna", which featured a sophisticated image for them, as the song lyrically tells about living with confidence by becoming an icon in this generation, like the music icon Madonna. In early to mid-2011, the group departed from their sexy image and released "Shy Boy". The song ushered a new image for Secret which was inspired by the American 50's fashion and features a "cutesy" concept. Secret continued to channel the image of their previous single with the release of "Starlight Moonlight" and maintained the "retro" theme.

In July and November 2011, the group began to expand in Japan with the release of the Japanese remake of "Madonna" and "Shy Boy". In December 2011, the group released a Christmas version of "Starlight Moonlight" entitled "Christmas Magic". The same year, Secret released their first studio album in two years entitled Moving in Secret. The lead single, "Love is Move" featured the genre of surf rock and signaled the return from their sexy image. In 2012, Secret released the ballad "So Much For Goodbye" in Japan, which portrayed the vocal side of Secret.

Music videos

2000s

2010s

Related music videos

Commercial Film (CF) Official Video

Grand Mer

Nike

Nene Chicken

Good Day Soju

Video albums

Concert tour videos

Music video compilations

Promotional videos

Video singles

See also
Secret discography
List of songs by Secret
List of awards and nominations received by Secret

References

External links 
 
 Secret Official Playlist under TSENT2008 on YouTube - created by TS Entertainment

Videographies of South Korean artists
Videography